Saudi Arabia–Thailand relations refers to the current and historical relations between Saudi Arabia and Thailand. Saudi Arabia has an embassy in Bangkok and Thailand has an embassy in Riyadh but representation is at the chargé d'affaires rather than ambassadorial level.  However Saudi Arabia and Thailand aim to restore the relations between their two nations. Relations between the two countries were established in 1957 and hundreds of thousands of Thais went to Saudi Arabia to work.  The historically friendly and strategic partnership between Saudi Arabia and Thailand has deteriorated significantly following the Blue Diamond Affair. Although regardless of relation status, Saudi Arabia and Thailand have high trade between two nations (see § Economic Relations). In recent years Saudi Arabia and Thailand have shown intent to repair the relations between the two kingdoms. On January 26, 2022, both countries announced they restored full diplomatic relations and would appoint ambassadors.

History
The Kingdom of Thailand and the Kingdom of Saudi Arabia have long and historic relations. The two Kingdoms have enjoyed warm and cordial relationships even before the establishment of formal diplomatic ties on 1 October 1957 with resident representative in their respective capitals.
In 1966 the status of their relation was upgraded to ambassador level, the first Saudi Arabian Ambassador to Thailand was H.E. Abdulrahman Al-Omran while H.E. Prasong Suwanpradhes was the first Thai Ambassador accredited to Saudi Arabia.

Relations between the two Kingdoms have been further strengthened by the visit to Saudi Arabia in January 1984 of the Thai delegation led by Thai Deputy Foreign Minister Prapas Limpabhandhu and high-ranking officials from the Ministry of Interior, Ministry of Commerce, Ministry of Agriculture and Cooperatives, as well as representatives from the Thai Parliament and the private sector.

According to Thai author Achara Ashayagachat:
″Before the downgrade and sanctions, up to 500,000 Thais worked in Saudi Arabia. Now perhaps just 100 are there. Thousands of students once studied in Saudi Arabia, but now only 300 do.″

According to the Royal Thai Embassy in Riyadh, Saudi Arabia:
″Thailand and Saudi Arabia always share similar views on major regional and international issues, especially those of vital importance to international peace and security. Both countries are working closely and supported each other's position in the United Nations and at other international fora.″

A Chronology of key events of Thai - Saudi Diplomatic Ties

Economic Relations
In 2004, Saudi Arabia was 24th major market for Thai exports and 3 rd major market of Thailand in Middle East.  Thailand ranked 20th among major traders with Saudi Arabia.

Saudi Arabia is Thailand's major supplier of crude oil. Thailand's trade with Saudi Arabia reached 2.9 Billion USD in 2004.

In 2005 two-way trade rose to 5 Billion USD. Thailand imported from Saudi Arabia to the value of 4 Billion USD, and exported to the value of 1 Billion USD.

Thailand imported mainly crude oil, petrochemical products and fertilizer while exporting to Saudi Arabia motor cars auto part and accessories, air conditioning machine, refrigerators, prepared or preserved fish, woven fabrics, washing machines,  machinery, garments, rice etc.

Thai labour in Saudi Arabia
Pre-Gulf War (1990) Saudi Arabia was the largest market for Thai oversea workers with its number over 200,000. . At present, according to the statistic provided by Ministry of foreign Affairs of Saudi Arabia, 10,000 Thais remain in the Kingdom.

Hajj and Islamic Affairs
Thailand, with its nearly 3 million Muslim population ascribes considerable importance to events in the two holy cities. The historical links between Thailand and Saudi Arabia could be traced back to the early days of the establishment of the Kingdom of Saudi Arabia. The number of Thai pilgrims performing the fifth pillar of Islam each year number approximately between 9,000 to 10,000.

In 2005, the number of Thai Pilgrims performing religious rituals in the holy cities of Makkah and Madinah reached 10,124.

Blue Diamond Affair fallout

The Blue Diamond Affair was a series of events triggered by the 1989 theft of gems belonging to the Saudi royal family by a Thai employee.  Mohammad al-Ruwaili, a Saudi Arabian businessman close to the Saudi royal family traveled to Bangkok to investigate the case, but was abducted and killed.  Three months later, three officials from the Saudi Embassy were also shot to death in Bangkok. The murders remained unsolved . The affair soured relations between Saudi Arabia and Thailand. In response Saudi Arabia stopped issuing working visas for Thais and discouraged its citizens from visiting the country.. Although there is a ban on travel, many Saudis violate it and travel to the Kingdom of Thailand, Elias Siyaman, a tourist company representative, said there is clear growth in the number of Saudi tourists, who come in fourth place among Gulf tourists. They travel via the closest airports to Bangkok. A large percentage of Saudi nationals come for tourism, and 70 percent are single. Diplomatic missions were downgraded to chargé d'affaires level.  The number of Thai workers in Saudi Arabia fell from more than 200,000 in before the theft to around 10,000 in 2008.

According to Arab News:

The fifth charge d'affaires since the 1990 diplomatic downgrade said many Thais and Saudis want to see warmer ties. "My mission is to communicate and see to the final resolution of this court case. The ball is in the Thai court now and Saudi Arabia is ready to celebrate together," he said as Riyadh awaits the verdict from the Court of Appeal, following last year's ruling by the Court of First Instance.
The Ruwaili family petitioned the King and appealed to the Appeal Court. "We will proceed through to the end [the highest court]. "I'm amazed and am wondering why Thai authorities can find culprits for [the murders of] British nationals but not for us," he said, adding the Ruwaili case was the only remaining chance for justice. "Whether we can restore good ties between us relies solely on this case." I believe the Thai government has good intentions to normalise relations. But the restoration will have to be done without the rights of our citizens being infringed upon," Mr Alsheaiby said.
Several businesses are keen to invest in Thailand, but they have been prohibited because of economic sanctions, he said. The Saudi low-cost airline, Flynas, is keen to launch a route between Jeddah and Bangkok to tap the market for tourists and Haj-Umrah pilgrims.
Currently, most flights between Saudi Arabia and Southeast Asia are via the Philippines and Indonesia as they supply workers to the Saudis. "Once relations are restored the Saudi private sector would like to hire Thais rather than other nationals," Mr Alsheaiby said.

Traveling to Thailand from Saudi Arabia requires an official business visit by the government. Personal business visits have to be authorized by the Chamber of Commerce and Industry. Tourism is not permitted to Thailand and violating the law by traveling to Thailand is taken seriously.  Violators may be subject to investigation leading to a fine or a jail sentence.  The number of Thai Muslim pilgrims permitted to perform the hajj pilgrimage has been strictly limited.

By 2009 there were signs of a thawing of relations.  UPI columnist Frank G. Anderson argues that "one theory is the Gulf rivalry between Iran and Saudi Arabia, wherein the Saudi kingdom finds Iran's growing influence in Thailand a disadvantage to its relations with Thailand".

Rahaf Mohammed

Rahaf Mohammed also known as Rahaf Qunoon, is a Saudi Arabian lady who ran away to Thailand to escape the harsh rules there. Thailand police and Saudi Arabian embassy officials tried to put her on a plane back to Saudi but it was too late; other countries had offered her a refugee visa.

See also 
Foreign relations of Saudi Arabia
Foreign relations of Thailand

References

 
Thailand
Bilateral relations of Thailand